Krak Glacier is an outlet glacier of Kraków Dome at the head of Lussich Cove, Martel Inlet, Admiralty Bay, King George Island, in the South Shetland Islands.It was named by the Polish Antarctic Expedition, 1980, after the legendary prince Krak, founder of Kraków and killer of the Wawel Dragon.

See also
 List of glaciers in the Antarctic
 Glaciology

References

 

Glaciers of King George Island (South Shetland Islands)
Poland and the Antarctic